Lara railway station is located on the Warrnambool line in Victoria, Australia. It serves the town of Lara, and it opened on 1 November 1856 as Duck Ponds. It was renamed Lara on 30 June 1875.

When Lara station opened, it was the temporary terminus of the Geelong – Melbourne line. The present station building was constructed in the 1920s, and the existing single platform on the east side of the line was converted into an island platform in June 1981, when the line from Lara to Little River was duplicated. In September of that year, the line to Corio was duplicated.

In 1973, a signal panel was provided at the station, and in 1981, it relocated into the station building. It was abolished in January 2006. No.2 road (loop siding) was also extended in 1973, providing a crossing loop. The loop siding is generally used by trains serving the Avalon Airshow, which terminate at Lara.

In 1962, flashing light signals were provided at the McClelland Avenue level crossing, located nearby in the Down direction of the station, with boom barriers provided later on in 1981.

In 1993, No.2 siding was abolished, along with a dwarf signal. In 1999, the station waiting room received an upgrade, including the installation of glass sliding doors.

The Western standard gauge line to Adelaide runs immediately west of the station.

Platforms and services

Lara has one island platform with two faces. It is serviced by V/Line Geelong line and selected Warrnambool line services.

Platform 1:
 services to Southern Cross
 weekend services to Southern Cross

Platform 2:
 services to Geelong, South Geelong, Marshall and Waurn Ponds
 weekend services to Warrnambool

Transport links

CDC Geelong operates three routes to and from Lara station, under contract to Public Transport Victoria:
: to Lara South (Weekday extension to Corio Shopping Centre)
: to Lara East
: to Lara West

References

External links
Victorian Railway Stations gallery

Railway stations in Australia opened in 1856
Regional railway stations in Victoria (Australia)
Railway stations in Geelong